USS LST-26 was a United States Navy  used in the Asiatic-Pacific Theater during World War II and manned by a United States Coast Guard crew. Like many of her class, she was not named and is properly referred to by her hull designation.

Construction
LST-26 was laid down on 16 November 1942, at Pittsburgh, Pennsylvania, by the Dravo Corporation; launched on 31 March 1943; sponsored by Mrs. Mathilda B. Coulter; and commissioned on 7 June 1943.

Service history
LST-26 sailed from Galveston, Texas, on 24 July 1943, with Convoy HK 111 heading for Key West, Florida, where she arrived on 28 July.

Proceeding to the Pacific, LST-26 was at Townsville, Australia, on 29 October 1943. LST-26 participated in the Cape Gloucester landings, New Britain at the end of December 1943 and January 1944.

LST-26 remained busy participating in the Aitape, Humboldt Bay-Tanahmerah Bay invasions at the end of April and the beginning of May 1944, the Toem-Wakde-Sarmi area operations in the middle of May 1944, the Biak Island invasion at the end of May to the middle of June 1944, the Noemfoor Island invasion at the beginning of July 1944, the Cape Sansapor landings at the end of July and the beginning of August 1944, and the Morotai landings in the middle of  September 1944.

From the Western New Guinea area LST-26 moved to the Philippines to participate in General Douglas MacArthur's promised liberation of the islands from the Japanese occupation starting with the Leyte landings from the middle of October until the middle of November 1944, and the Mindanao Island landings in March 1945. She left Leyte on 3 April 1945, for Manila and after proceeding to Subic Bay returned to Leyte on 2 May 1945. Departing Leyte on 8 August 1945, she proceeded to Manus, Torokina and Hollandia.

Postwar career
Following the war, LST-26 performed occupation duty in the Far East until early November 1945. Leaving Hollandia on 29 August 1945, she arrived at Zamboanga, Mindanao on 3 September 1945. From there she went to Okinawa and returned to San Francisco, via Leyte and Pearl Harbor, arriving at San Francisco on 6 December 1945. She returned to the United States and was decommissioned on 1 April 1946. She was struck from the Navy list on 8 May 1946, and was sold to Arctic Circle Exploration, Seattle, Washington, on 17 June 1946, for conversion to merchant service.

Awards
LST-26 earned five battle stars for her World War II service.

References

Bibliography

External links

 

LST-1-class tank landing ships of the United States Navy
World War II amphibious warfare vessels of the United States
Ships built in Pittsburgh
1943 ships
United States Navy ships crewed by the United States Coast Guard
Ships built by Dravo Corporation